Jérémy Villeneuve (born 25 April 1994) is a professional footballer who plays as a midfielder for French club Le Puy. Born in France, he represents Mauritius at international level.

Career
Born in Paris, Villeneuve has played for INF Clairefontaine, Strasbourg B, Guingamp BReims B, Drancy, Ivry and Le Puy.

He made his international debut for Mauritius in 2017.

References

1994 births
Living people
French people of Mauritian descent
French footballers
Mauritian footballers
Mauritius international footballers
INF Clairefontaine players
RC Strasbourg Alsace players
En Avant Guingamp players
Stade de Reims players
JA Drancy players
US Ivry players
Le Puy Foot 43 Auvergne players
Championnat National 2 players
Championnat National 3 players
Association football midfielders
Footballers from Paris